Feargus Urquhart is a Scottish-American video game designer and CEO of Obsidian Entertainment.

Career 

Urquhart is best known for his work at Interplay Entertainment, particularly as leader of Black Isle Studios, Interplay's internal role-playing video game division which Urquhart established in 1997. With them, Urquhart worked on the first two Fallout games.

When Interplay ran into financial difficulties and Black Isle's future became uncertain, Urquhart and several other industry veterans departed to found Obsidian Entertainment, in 2003.

Personal life 
Urquhart lives in West Irvine, California. He and his wife Margo have two children: Katie and Aidan.

Awards 
In 1999, IGN's RPG Vault gave him the award for an Unsung Hero of the Year, stating that "since he is always quick to deflect credit away from himself, the great majority of fans remain unaware of Feargus' actual contributions to Black Isle's titles. We won't give away his secrets other than to say we consider him a very worthy initial winner of this award."

References

External links

Feargus Urquhart on MobyGames

Black Isle Studios
Fallout (series) developers
Interplay Entertainment people
Living people
Obsidian Entertainment people
Scottish chief executives
Video game businesspeople
Video game producers
Xbox Game Studios
Year of birth missing (living people)